The College of Life Sciences and Biotechnology is the largest BT college in the country with 90 full-time faculty, 1,400 undergraduate students, and 450 graduate students. The College merged the existing College of Life Sciences and College of Life and Environmental Sciences and unified the departmental structures. It restructured and merged the Division of Life Sciences by merging the College of Life Sciences' Departments of Biology, Food Science, and Genetic Engineering, and College of Life and Environmental Sciences' Divisions of Life and Genetic Engineering, Bio Industry Sciences, Food Sciences, and Environmental and Ecology, and the Department of Food and Resources Economics.

History

Departments
 Life Sciences
 Biotechnology  
 Food Science
 Food and Resource Economics  
 Environmental Science and Ecological Engineering

Korea University schools